A buttress is an architectural structure built against or projecting from a wall which serves to support or reinforce the wall. Buttresses are fairly common on more ancient buildings, as a means of providing support to act against the lateral (sideways) forces arising out of inadequately braced roof structures.

The term counterfort can be synonymous with buttress and is often used when referring to dams, retaining walls and other structures holding back earth.

Early examples of buttresses are found on the Eanna Temple (ancient Uruk), dating to as early as the 4th millennium BC.

Terminology 
In addition to flying and ordinary buttresses, brick and masonry buttresses that support wall corners can be classified according to their ground plan. A clasping or clamped buttress has an L shaped ground plan surrounding the corner, an angled buttress has two buttresses meeting at the corner, a setback buttress is similar to an angled buttress but the buttresses are set back from the corner, and a diagonal (or 'French') buttress is at 135° to the walls (45° off of where a regular buttress would be).

The gallery below shows top-down views of various types of buttress (dark grey) supporting the corner wall of a structure (light grey).

Gallery

See also 
Cathedral architecture
Flying buttress
Pilaster
Retaining wall

References

External links

Fortification (architectural elements)
Castle architecture
Columns and entablature
Architectural elements